Operation Junkyard is an American television series that aired from October 5, 2002 to February 15, 2003 on Discovery Kids.  Essentially a spin-off of TLC's popular series Junkyard Wars, OP/JY featured teams of teens that were challenged to build gadgets out of junk in six hours. Teams featured on the show include the Rummaging Robots and Jurassic Junkers, and the teams were tasked to build gadgets like water bailing machines, mud scooters, and remote control battleships.

Premise
At the beginning of each show the challenge of the day was revealed and teams attempted to collect "bodgits" by completing small challenges. "Bodgits" were helpful advantages that teams could earn, including time with the on-set engineer or special parts for use in their build. Two identical school buses filled with junk were given to the teams, who had six hours to create their contraptions.

Teams

Episodes

References

External links

2002 American television series debuts
2003 American television series endings
2000s American reality television series
2000s American teen television series
American educational television series
American television spin-offs
Discovery Kids original programming
English-language television shows
Television series about teenagers
Television shows filmed in California
Television series by Banijay